Gibson Atherton (January 19, 1831 – November 10, 1887) was a U.S. Representative from Ohio.

Early life
He was the son of John Trueman Atherton (1799-1882) and Clarissa Ackley (1796-1883). He attended Denison University, Granville, Ohio.

He graduated from Miami University, Oxford, Ohio, in 1853. He served as Principal of the local academy at Osceola, Missouri, in 1853 and 1854.

Later he studied law, and was admitted to the bar in 1855 and commenced practice in Newark, Ohio where he also served as president of the board of education of Newark for fifteen years.

Career
Atherton was elected prosecuting attorney of Licking County in 1857 and reelected in 1859 and 1861. While serving as mayor of Newark 1860–1864, he was an unsuccessful Democratic candidate for the State senate in 1863. He ran for judge of the court of common pleas in 1866, but was unsuccessful.
Other local and national political service included time as member of the city council of Newark for two years and a delegate to the Democratic National Convention at St. Louis in 1876.

Atherton was elected as a Democrat to the Forty-sixth and Forty-seventh Congresses (March 4, 1879 – March 3, 1883), but afterwards chose not to seek renomination.

Atherton was appointed to the Ohio Supreme Court by Governor Hoadly August 20, 1885 to fill a vacancy created by the death of John W. Okey. He lost election for the remaining two years of Okey's term that autumn to his Republican opponent, and resigned December 16 of that year.

After retiring from the bench, he resumed the practice of law until his death in Newark, Ohio.

Personal
Atherton married Margaret A. E. Kumler in Butler County, Ohio on November 18, 1856. They had four children and all were born in Ohio.

His eldest daughter, Clara B. Atherton (1858-1939)  was an accomplished linguist who worked for the War Department in Washington DC. In 1885 she toured Europe with her parents. It was in Italy where she met her future husband, Emil Reidel. They married in Malta on Mar 17, 1886 and had 2 children.

His other three children were Charles E Atherton (born 1860), Della M Atherton (born 1865) and Anna V Atherton (born 1867).

He died on November 10, 1887. He was interred in Cedar Hill Cemetery.

Ancestry
His grandfather, Thomas Atherton (1765-1848) moved from Pennsylvania to Ohio.

He descended from Quakers; his great grandfather Caleb Atherton (1736-1776), being a Quaker who was “outed” on Oct 4, 1764 at the Uwchlan Monthly Quaker Meeting for not following their principles and for marrying "out of their Society. Caleb died in the revolutionary war at the Battle of Wyoming. He is related to historian, Lewis Eldon Atherton.

The next generation back had emigrated to Pennsylvania from Farnworth, Lancashire in the 1700s. He a direct descendant of Gawain Atherton. His distant Atherton relatives include Bobby Atherton and Tommy Atherton.

References

External Sources

1831 births
1887 deaths
Politicians from Newark, Ohio
Miami University alumni
Justices of the Ohio Supreme Court
Denison University alumni

Democratic Party members of the United States House of Representatives from Ohio
Mayors of places in Ohio
Burials at Cedar Hill Cemetery, Newark, Ohio
19th-century American politicians
19th-century American judges